Gold crown may refer to:
 Crown (British coin)
 Geumgwan(), royal gold crowns of Gaya and Silla.
Gold Crown Tomb(Geumgwanchong), a Silla tumulus located in modern-day Gyeongju, South Korea.
 Gold Crown of Merit
Full gold crown in Dentistry.
 Model of Billiards and Pool Tables from Brunswick_Bowling_%26_Billiards, manufactured from 1961 to the present.